Yliaster (also known as Iliaster or Yliastrum) is the term coined by Paracelsus which refers to "prime matter, consisting of body and soul". Paracelsus described it as the "completely healed human being who has burned away all the dross of his lower being and is free to fly as the Phoenix." It is most likely a portmanteau of the Greek hyle (matter) and Latin astrum (star). To Paracelsus, the Yliaster represented the two basic compounds of the cosmos, matter representing "below", and the stars representing "above". Paracelsus says this of the Yliaster while describing how fossils are trapped in wood:

In this sense, the Yliaster is the same as the Prima Materia. It is the formless base of all matter which is the raw material for the alchemical Great Work.

References

Alchemical substances
Mythological substances